Malapterurus tanoensis is a species of electric catfish native to Côte d'Ivoire and Ghana where it occurs in the Ofin and Tano Rivers.

This species grows to a length of  SL.

References 

 

Malapteruridae
Catfish of Africa
Freshwater fish of West Africa
Taxa named by Tyson R. Roberts
Fish described in 2000
Strongly electric fish